Soul Español is an album by jazz pianist Oscar Peterson, released in 1966. It focuses mostly on the music of Brazilian composers.

Reception

Writing for AllMusic, critic Ken Dryden wrote "With the surge of interest in bossa nova and samba, Peterson's interpretations of songs like "Manha de Carnaval," "How Insensitive," "Meditation," and "Samba de Orfeo" have stood up very well against similar jazz recordings of the mid-'60s. This is an enjoyable, if not essential, part of Oscar Peterson's considerable discography."

Track listing
"Mas que Nada" (Jorge Ben Jor) – 2:27
"Manhã de Carnaval" (Luiz Bonfá, Vinicius de Moraes) – 3:45
"Call Me" (Tony Hatch) – 5:19
"How Insensitive" (de Moraes, Norman Gimbel, Antonio Carlos Jobim) – 4:02
"Carioca" (Edward Eliscu, Gus Kahn, Vincent Youmans) – 4:31
"Soulville Samba" (Oscar Peterson) – 2:25
"Amanha (Tomorrow)" (Phil Bodner) – 4:21
"Meditation" (Gimbel, Jobim, Newton Mendonca) – 4:15
"Samba Sensitive" (Peterson) – 3:20
"Samba de Orfeu" (Bonfá, de Moraes) – 3:51

Personnel
 Oscar Peterson - piano
 Sam Jones - double bass
 Louis Hayes - drums
 Henley Gibson - conga
 Harold Jones - percussion
 Marshall Thompson - timbales

References

1966 albums
Oscar Peterson albums
Limelight Records albums